Municipal elections were held in Paraguay on Sunday, October 10, 2021, to elect Mayors and Councilors of municipal boards of the 261 districts of the country, for the period 2021–2025.

These elections were originally scheduled to take place in 2020, but due to the COVID-19 pandemic they were postponed until 2021.

General data
The website of the Tribunal Superior de Justicia Electoral (TSJE), the local elections regulatory agency, reflects the following electoral demographic data:

A total of 261 municipalities will elect their respective Mayors and 2,781 Councilors of the Municipal Board. 

Per La Nacion, 10/11/21: ANR controlled 162, the PLRA controlled 62, and Others controlled 37. The ANR retained Asuncion. The ANR retook Concepcion. And the Alliance took Ciudad del Este.

References

External links
Resolución TSJE Nº 42/2020

Elections in Paraguay
Elec
Paraguay
Paraguay